Solorinic acid is an anthraquinone pigment found in the leafy lichen Solorina crocea. It is responsible for the strong orange colour of the medulla and the underside of the thallus in that species.

The structure of solorinic acid, 2-n-hexanoyl-1,3,8-trihydroxy-6-methoxy-anthraquinone, was proposed by Koller and Russ in 1937, and verified by chemical synthesis in 1966.

Norsolorinic acid, (C20H18O7, 2-hexanoyl-1,3,6,8-tetrahydroxyanthraquinone), is a closely related compound also found in Solorina crocea.

Solorinic acid was used as the internal standard in the establishment of a standardized method for the identification of lichen products using high-performance liquid chromatography. This is because it is quite a hydrophobic compound, and consequently will elute more slowly than most lichen products, making possible the identification of lichen extracts containing chlorinated xanthones or long chain depsides.

Although usually associated with Solorina crocea, solorinic acid was reported as a lichen product from the crustose, rock-dwelling lichen Placolecis kunmingensis, described as a species new to science in 2019.

References

Lichen products
Polyketides
Anthraquinones